Challicum Hills Wind Farm is a wind farm encompassed by 35 (1.5 MW) NEG NM 64 wind turbines,  with a total generating capacity of 52.5 MW of electricity. The wind farm is near Ararat in western  Victoria, Australia. The power station was commissioned in August 2003 and is in a long term Power Purchase Agreement (PPA) with Origin Energy.

The wind farm is owned and operated by Pacific Hydro. Part of the profits flow into a community fund that supports local projects.

See also

List of wind farms in Victoria
Wind power in Australia

References

External links 
Pacific Hydro page on Challicum Hills Wind Farm
Clean Energy Council

Ararat, Victoria
Wind farms in Victoria (Australia)